The Río Grande is a river in the province of Lugo, in the autonomous community of Galicia, Spain. It rises in the mountains of Trabada, then north into Lourenzá and finally Ribadeo.

See also
 Rivers of Galicia

Rivers of Spain
Rivers of Galicia (Spain)